T.Velangudi is the village panchayat in Virudhunagar district in the state of Tamil Nadu, India. its belongs to Tiruchuli Taluk and Narikudi panchayat union. According to 2011 census No of People living here is 1393 (Male population 704 Female population 689). Agriculture is the main occupation for the majority of the people.

School 
Govt Middle School T.Velangudi With Govt Library.

Hospital 
Govt Primary Health Centre.

Temples 
 Veyil Ugantha Amman Temple
 Ariyana Swami Temple
 Ayyanar Temple
 Perumal Temple

References

Villages in Virudhunagar district